Reinbeck Community School District is a rural public school district headquartered in Reinbeck, Iowa.

The district includes sections of Black Hawk, Grundy, and Marshall counties. Communities served include Reinbeck and Lincoln.

The school's mascot is the Rebel. Their colors are blue and silver.

History
Gladbrook Community School District and the Reinbeck Community School District consolidated in 1988 to form Gladbrook–Reinbeck Community School District.

In 2017, there was a proposal to dissolve the Gladbrook–Reinbeck district and have five other districts assume control of portions of the district, but voters turned down the proposal by 69%. The proposal was made in response to the closure of Gladbrook Elementary.

Previously the football team had a rivalry with Grundy Center High School that began circa 1908; circa 2017 the Gladbrook–Reinbeck team was moved to an eight-man division, forcing the rivalry to end.

Operations
By 2014, the Gladbrook–Reinbeck, GMG, BCLUW, and North Tama school districts shared a single director of curriculum and innovation; districts may share employees as a way of saving money.

Schools
Gladbrook–Reinbeck Elementary School
Gladbrook–Reinbeck High School

Previously the district had two school sites, one in Reinbeck, and one in Gladbrook; the Gladbrook building had elementary and middle school grades. The Gladbrook school closed in May 2015.

 Gladbrook–Reinbeck High School had about 260 students.

Gladbrook–Reinbeck High School

Athletics
The Rebels compete in the North Iowa Cedar League Conference in the following sports:

Cross country
Volleyball
Football
 2-time class A state champions (2015, 2016)
Basketball
Boys' 2015 class 1A state champions
Wrestling
Track and field
Golf
 Boys' 1999 class 1A state champions
Baseball
Softball
Soccer

See also
List of school districts in Iowa
List of high schools in Iowa

References

External links
 Gladbrook-Reinbeck Community School District

School districts in Iowa
Education in Black Hawk County, Iowa
Education in Grundy County, Iowa
Education in Marshall County, Iowa
Education in Tama County, Iowa
1988 establishments in Iowa
School districts established in 1988